Taxi 4 (stylized on-screen as T4Xi) is a 2007 French action comedy film directed by Gérard Krawczyk and the fourth installment of the Taxi film series. It is a sequel to Taxi 3 and followed by Taxi 5.  As with all the other films in the franchise Gallic Taxi, Samy Naceri plays taxi driver "Daniel Morales", this time in a Peugeot 407, unlike the 406 in the previous films. Frédéric Diefenthal is "Émilien Coutant-Kerbalec", whilst Jean-Christophe Bouvet reprises his role as "General Bertineau" yet again.

The film also features French footballer Djibril Cissé.

Plot 
A Belgian criminal, wanted all over Europe for his crimes, is in the custody of the Police Department of Marseille to be watched for a few hours before transfer to a prison in the Congo. Unfortunately, Émilien (Frédéric Diefenthal) is tricked by the villain and convinced to let the prisoner go.

After these events, he is fired, but luckily for him, his friend Daniel (Samy Naceri) helps him one more time by telling him the location where the criminal is located, having been the taxi driver who drove him after he left the police station, not knowing he was a criminal. With Daniel's skills and his new Peugeot 407, Émillen seeks to capture the criminal to restore his job back.

Cast
Samy Naceri as Daniel Morales
Frédéric Diefenthal as Émilien Coutant-Kerbalec
Bernard Farcy as Commissaire Gibert
Jean-Christophe Bouvet as Général Edmond Bertineau
Edouard Montoute as Alain
Emma Sjöberg-Wiklund as Petra
Djibril Cissé as himself
François Damiens as Serge
Jean-Luc Couchard as Le Belge

Production
TBA

Reception

Box office
On the opening day, 450,000 people attended in France, with 43,000 in Paris alone. T4xis Canadian premiere was at the Just for Laughs Comedia Film Festival on 22 July 2007, a week before a wide release.

References

External links 
 
 
 

2007 films
2000s action comedy films
2000s crime comedy films
Films about organized crime in France
Films directed by Gérard Krawczyk
French sequel films
French action comedy films
French crime comedy films
Films produced by Luc Besson
Taxi (film series)
2007 comedy films